Medical education is education related to the practice of being a medical practitioner, including the initial training to become a physician (i.e., medical school and internship) and additional training thereafter (e.g., residency, fellowship, and continuing medical education).

Medical education and training varies considerably across the world. Various teaching methodologies have been used in medical education, which is an active area of educational research.

Medical education is also the subject-didactic academic field of educating medical doctors at all levels, including entry-level, post-graduate, and continuing medical education. Specific requirements such as entrustable professional activities must be met before moving on in stages of medical education.

Common techniques and evidence base
Medical education applies theories of pedagogy specifically in the context of medical education. Medical education has been a leader in the field of evidence-based education, through the development of evidence syntheses such as the Best Evidence Medical Education collection, formed in 1999, which aimed to "move from opinion-based education to evidence-based education". Common evidence-based techniques include the Objective structured clinical examination (commonly known as the 'OSCE)  to assess clinical skills, and reliable checklist-based assessments to determine the development of soft skills such as professionalism. However there is a persistence of ineffective instructional methods in medical education, such as the matching of teaching to learning styles and Edgar Dales' "Cone of Learning".

Entry-level education

Entry-level medical education programs are tertiary-level courses undertaken at a medical school. Depending on jurisdiction and university, these may be either undergraduate-entry (most of Europe, Asia, South America and Oceania), or graduate-entry programs (mainly Australia, Philippines and North America). Some jurisdictions and universities provide both undergraduate entry programs and graduate entry programs (Australia, South Korea).

In general, initial training is taken at medical school. Traditionally initial medical education is divided between preclinical and clinical studies. The former consists of the basic sciences such as anatomy, physiology, biochemistry, pharmacology, pathology. The latter consists of teaching in the various areas of clinical medicine such as internal medicine, pediatrics, obstetrics and gynecology, psychiatry, general practice and surgery.

There has been a proliferation of programmes that combine medical training with research (M.D./Ph.D.) or management programmes (M.D./ MBA), although this has been criticised because extended interruption to clinical study has been shown to have a detrimental effect on ultimate clinical knowledge.

The LCME and the "Function and Structure of a Medical School" 
The Liaison Committee on Medical Education (LCME) is a committee of educational accreditation for schools of medicine leading to an MD in the United States and Canada. In order to maintain accreditation, medical schools are required to ensure that students meet a certain set of standards and competencies, defined by the accreditation committees. The "Function and Structure of a Medical School" article is a yearly published article from the LCME that defines 12 accreditation standards.

Entrustable Professional Activities for entering residency 
The Association of American Medical Colleges (AAMC) has recommended thirteen Entrustable Professional Activities (EPAs) that medical students should be expected to accomplish prior to beginning a residency program. EPAs are based on the integrated core competencies developed over the course of medical school training. Each EPA lists its key feature, associated competencies, and observed behaviors required for completion of that activity. The students progress through levels of understanding and capability, developing with decreasing need for direct supervision. Eventually students should be able to perform each activity independently, only requiring assistance in situations of unique or uncommon complexity.

The list of topics that EPAs address include:

 History and physical exam skills
 Differential diagnosis
 Diagnostic/screening tests
 Orders and prescriptions
 Patient encounter documentation
 Oral presentations of patient encounters
 Clinical questioning/using evidence 
 Patient handovers/transitions of care
 Teamwork
 Urgent/Emergency care
 Informed consent
 Procedures
 Safety and improvement

Postgraduate education

Following completion of entry-level training, newly graduated doctors are often required to undertake a period of supervised practice before full registration is granted; this is most often of one-year duration and may be referred to as an "internship" or "provisional registration" or "residency".

Further training in a particular field of medicine may be undertaken. In the U.S., further specialized training, completed after residency is referred to as "fellowship".  In some jurisdictions, this is commenced immediately following completion of entry-level training, while other jurisdictions require junior doctors to undertake generalist (unstreamed) training for a number of years before commencing specialization.

Each residency and fellowship program is accredited by the  Accreditation Council for Graduate Medical Education (ACGME), a non-profit organization led by physicians with the goal of enhancing educational standards among physicians. The ACGME oversees all MD and DO residency programs in the United States. As of 2019, there were approximately 11,700 ACGME accredited residencies and fellowship programs in 181 specialties and subspecialties.

Education theory itself is becoming an integral part of postgraduate medical training. Formal qualifications in education are also becoming the norm for medical educators, such that there has been a rapid increase in the number of available graduate programs in medical education.

Continuing medical education
In most countries, continuing medical education (CME) courses are required for continued licensing. CME requirements vary by state and by country. In the USA, accreditation is overseen by the Accreditation Council for Continuing Medical Education (ACCME).  Physicians often attend dedicated lectures, grand rounds, conferences, and performance improvement activities in order to fulfill their requirements. Additionally, physicians are increasingly opting to pursue further graduate-level training in the formal study of medical education as a pathway for continuing professional development.

Online learning
Medical education is increasingly utilizing online teaching, usually within learning management systems (LMSs) or virtual learning environments (VLEs). Additionally, several medical schools have incorporated the use of blended learning combining the use of video, asynchronous, and in-person exercises. A landmark scoping review published in 2018 demonstrated that online teaching modalities are becoming increasingly prevalent in medical education, with associated high student satisfaction and improvement on knowledge tests. However, the use of evidence-based multimedia design principles in the development of online lectures was seldom reported, despite their known effectiveness in medical student contexts. To enhance variety in an online delivery environment, the use of serious games, which have previously shown benefit in medical education, can be incorporated to break the monotony of online-delivered lectures.

Research areas into online medical education include practical applications, including simulated patients and virtual medical records (see also: telehealth). When compared to no intervention, simulation in medical education
training is associated with positive effects on knowledge, skills, and behaviors and moderate effects for patient outcomes. However, data is inconsistent on the effectiveness of asynchronous online learning when compared to traditional in-person lectures. Furthermore, studies utilizing modern visualization technology (i.e. virtual and augmented reality) have shown great promise as means to supplement lesson content in physiological and anatomical education.

Telemedicine/telehealth education 
With the advent of telemedicine (aka telehealth), students learn to interact with and treat patients online, an increasingly important skill in medical education. In training, students and clinicians enter a "virtual patient room" in which they interact and share information with a simulated or real patient actors. Students are assessed based on professionalism, communication, medical history gathering, physical exam, and ability to make shared decisions with the patient actor.

Medical education systems by country

At present, in the United Kingdom, a typical medicine course at university is five years, or four years if the student already holds a degree. Among some institutions and for some students, it may be six years (including the selection of an intercalated BSc—taking one year—at some point after the pre-clinical studies).  All programs culminate in the Bachelor of Medicine and Surgery degree (abbreviated MBChB, MBBS, MBBCh, BM, etc.). This is followed by two clinical foundation years afterward, namely F1 and F2, similar to internship training. Students register with the UK General Medical Council at the end of F1. At the end of F2, they may pursue further years of study. The system in Australia is very similar, with registration by the Australian Medical Council (AMC).

In the US and Canada, a potential medical student must first complete an undergraduate degree in any subject before applying to a graduate medical school to pursue an (M.D. or D.O.) program.  U.S. medical schools are almost all four-year programs.  Some students opt for the research-focused M.D./Ph.D. dual degree program, which is usually completed in 7–10 years. There are certain courses that are pre-requisite for being accepted to medical school, such as general chemistry, organic chemistry, physics, mathematics, biology, English, labwork, etc. The specific requirements vary by school.

In Australia, there are two pathways to a medical degree. Students can choose to take a five- or six-year undergraduate medical degree Bachelor of Medicine/Bachelor of Surgery (MBBS or BMed) as a first tertiary degree directly after secondary school graduation, or first complete a bachelor's degree (in general three years, usually in the medical sciences) and then apply for a four-year graduate entry Bachelor of Medicine/Bachelor of Surgery (MBBS) program.

See:

 North America

 Medical education in Canada
 Medical education in Panama
 Medical education in Mexico
 Medical education in the United States

 Europe

 Medical education in France
 Medical education in Norway
 Medical education in the United Kingdom

 Asia/Middle East/Oceania

 Medical education in Australia
 Medical education in China
 Medical education in Hong Kong
 Medical education in India
 Medical education in Jordan
 Medical education in the Philippines

 Africa

 Medical education in South Africa
 Medical education in Uganda

Norms and values 
Along with training individuals in the practice of medicine, medical education will influence the norms and values of those people who pass through it.  This occur through explicit training in medical ethics, or implicitly through "hidden curriculum" a body of norms and values that students will come to understand implicitly but is not formally taught. The hidden curriculum and formal ethics curriculum will often contradict one another..

The aims of medical ethics training are to give medical doctors the ability to recognise ethical issues, reason about them morally and legally when making clinical decisions, and be able to interact to obtain the information necessary to do so.

The hidden curriculum may include the use of unprofessional behaviours for efficiency or viewing the academic hierarchy as more important than the patient. The concept of "professionalism" may be used as a device to ensure obedience, with complaints about ethics and safety being labelled as unprofessional .

Integration with health policy 
As medical professional stakeholders in the field of health care (i.e. entities integrally involved in the health care system and affected by reform), the practice of medicine (i.e. diagnosing, treating, and monitoring disease) is directly affected by the ongoing changes in both national and local health policy and economics.

There is a growing call for health professional training programs to not only adopt more rigorous health policy education and leadership training, but to apply a broader lens to the concept of teaching and implementing health policy through health equity and social disparities that largely affect health and patient outcomes. Increased mortality and morbidity rates occur from birth to age 75, attributed to medical care (insurance access, quality of care), individual behavior (smoking, diet, exercise, drugs, risky behavior), socioeconomic and demographic factors (poverty, inequality, racial disparities, segregation), and physical environment (housing, education, transportation, urban planning).  A country's health care delivery system reflects its “underlying values, tolerances, expectations, and cultures of the societies they serve”, and medical professionals stand in a unique position to influence opinion and policy of patients, healthcare administrators, & lawmakers.

In order to truly integrate health policy matters into physician and medical education, training should begin as early as possible – ideally during medical school or premedical coursework – to build “foundational knowledge and analytical skills” continued during residency and reinforced throughout clinical practice, like any other core skill or competency. This source further recommends adopting a national standardized core health policy curriculum for medical schools and residencies in order to introduce a core foundation in this much needed area, focusing on four main domains of health care: (1) systems and principles (e.g. financing; payment; models of management; information technology; physician workforce), (2) quality and safety (e.g. quality improvement indicators, measures, and outcomes; patient safety), (3) value and equity (e.g. medical economics, medical decision making, comparative effectiveness, health disparities), and (4) politics and law (e.g. history and consequences of major legislations; adverse events, medical errors, and malpractice).

However limitations to implementing these health policy courses mainly include perceived time constraints from scheduling conflicts, the need for an interdisciplinary faculty team, and lack of research / funding to determine what curriculum design may best suit the program goals. Resistance in one pilot program was seen from program directors who did not see the relevance of the elective course and who were bounded by program training requirements limited by scheduling conflicts and inadequate time for non-clinical activities. But for students in one medical school study, those taught higher-intensity curriculum (vs lower-intensity) were “three to four times as likely to perceive themselves as appropriately trained in components of health care systems”, and felt it did not take away from getting poorer training in other areas.  Additionally, recruiting and retaining a diverse set of multidisciplinary instructors and policy or economic experts with sufficient knowledge and training may be limited at community-based programs or schools without health policy or public health departments or graduate programs. Remedies may include having online courses, off-site trips to the capitol or health foundations, or dedicated externships, but these have interactive, cost, and time constraints as well. Despite these limitations, several programs in both medical school and residency training have been pioneered.

Lastly, more national support and research will be needed to not only establish these programs but to evaluate how to both standardize and innovate the curriculum in a way that is flexible with the changing health care and policy landscape. In the United States, this will involve coordination with the ACGME (Accreditation Council for Graduate Medical Education), a private NPO that sets educational and training standards for U.S. residencies and fellowships that determines funding and ability to operate.

Medical education as a subject-didactic field
Medical education is also the subject-didactic field of educating medical doctors at all levels, applying theories of pedagogy in the medical context, with its own journals, such as Medical Education. Researchers and practitioners in this field are usually medical doctors or educationalists. Medical curricula vary between medical schools, and are constantly evolving in response to the need of medical students, as well as the resources available. Medical schools have been documented to utilize various forms of problem-based learning, team-based learning, and simulation. The Liaison Committee on Medical Education (LCME) publishes standard guidelines regarding goals of medical education, including curriculum design, implementation, and evaluation.

The objective structured clinical examinations (OSCEs) are widely utilized as a way to assess health science students' clinical abilities in a controlled setting. Although used in medical education programs throughout the world, the methodology for assessment may vary between programs and thus attempts to standardize the assessment have been made.

Cadaver laboratory 

Medical schools and surgical residency programs may utilize cadavers to identify anatomy, study pathology, perform procedures, correlate radiology findings, and identify causes of death. With the integration of technology, traditional cadaver dissection has been debated regarding its effectiveness in medical education, but remains a large component of medical curriculum around the world. Didactic courses in cadaver dissection are commonly offered by certified anatomists, scientists, and physicians with a background in the subject.

Medical curriculum and evidence-based medical education journals 
Medical curriculum vary widely among medical schools and residency programs, but generally follow an evidence based medical education (EBME) approach. These evidence based approaches are published in medical journals. The list of peer-reviewed medical education journals includes, but is not limited to:

 Academic Medicine 
 Medical Education
 Advances in Health Science Education
 Medical Teacher

Open access medical education journals:

 BMC Medical Education
 MedEDPORTAL
 Journal of Medical Education and Curricular Development

Graduate Medical Education and Continuing Medical Education focused journals:

 Journal of Continuing Education in the Health Professions
 Journal of Graduate Medical Education

This is not a complete list of medical education journals. Each medical journal in this list has a varying impact factor, or mean number of citations indicating how often it is used in scientific research and study.

See also 
 Doctors to Be (an occasional series on BBC television)
 INMED
 List of medical schools
 List of medical education agencies
 Objective Structured Clinical Examination
 Perspectives on Medical Education, a journal
 Progress testing
 Validation of foreign studies and degrees
 Virtual patient

Explanatory notes

References

Further reading

External links 

  of the Academy of Medical Educators